A.F.C. Rushden & Diamonds is an English football club based in Rushden in Northamptonshire. They played their opening season at Kiln Park, the home of Raunds Town, in 2011–12 and subsequently shared the Dog & Duck ground with Wellingborough Town from July 2012 to the summer of 2017. A groundshare agreement with Rushden & Higham United was agreed for the 2017–18 season. The club was formed by supporters in July 2011, after Rushden & Diamonds, a former Football League club, were expelled from the Football Conference and liquidated.

At an open meeting chaired by a supporters group called SaveRDFC, a mandate was agreed upon to create a phoenix club, fully owned and controlled by its supporters. A team was created and accepted into the Northants Senior Youth League for the 2011–12 season, while a senior team played in the United Counties Football League Division One for the 2012–13 season.

History

Background
The original Rushden & Diamonds was formed on 21 April 1992, following the merger of Irthlingborough Diamonds and Rushden Town. The club's early years were marked by success. Within four seasons the club had reached the Conference National, and within nine the club were members of the Football League. However, following their promotion to Division Two the Diamonds' fortunes took a turn for the worse. The club were relegated twice in three years, and suffered instability off the field. Seven different managers took charge of the team between March 2004 and May 2011, while the club itself was controlled by four different parties during the same period. Following a period of sustained financial difficulties during the 2010–11 season, the club were expelled from the Conference at the end of the campaign, and entered administration that July.

Establishment
AFC Rushden & Diamonds was created during the summer of 2011 by Rushden & Diamonds fans as a "phoenix club" after the original Diamonds were expelled from the Conference National, and subsequently went on to fail to secure a place in the Southern League Premier Division. After missing the FA league deadline for registering a senior side, AFC R&D formed a youth team to compete in the Northants Senior Youth League for the club's inaugural 2011–12 season, with the intention of fielding a senior side the following year. Following an open fans' meeting, supporters voted to play their games for the 2011–12 season at Kiln Park, Raunds, the home of Raunds Town. Former Rushden & Diamonds head of youth development Mark Starmer was appointed as manager, initially taking control of the Under-18 side. The U18s were accepted into the Northants Senior Youth League for the 2011–12 season, but no senior side was registered in time for that season.

The club's first match was a 3–0 loss to Raunds Town in a friendly youth match played on 6 August 2011, attended by 350 supporters. The first ever competitive goal scored at any level for the new club was a penalty from Lewi Williams in the inaugural match of the Dale Roberts Memorial Cup against Cleveland Juniors at Kiln Park on 14 August 2011. The Diamonds played their first competitive game on 25 August 2011, winning 3–0 against Daventry Town in the Northants Senior Youth League. The side ended the league campaign in fifth place with 30 points from their 16 games, and they won the NYSL Knock-out Cup, beating AFC Kempston Rovers 4–1 in the final held at Corby Town's Steel Park. Throughout the season the club established partnerships with other local clubs which saw money donated to the club, the establishment of a youth development programme, and the acquirement of a playing field and home ground until the end of the 2012–13 season.

Ahead of 2012–13, Mark Starmer was given the First Team Manager post, with ex-Rushden & Diamonds player Andy Peaks appointed as his assistant. The senior team were registered to play in the United Counties Football League Division One, playing its home games at the Dog and Duck, home of Wellingborough Town. A Women's team and a series of Youth teams were also established.

Senior football
The senior side's first match was a 3–0 victory in a friendly against Crawley Green on 17 July 2012. Striker Peter Okechukwu scored the senior team's first goal, with a crowd of approximately 100 watching the match. A month later, AFC Rushden & Diamonds beat Thrapston Town 3–0 in their first ever competitive senior match, with goals from Alfie Taylor (2) and Jack Wisniewski in front of 784 supporters. The club had mixed form throughout the season, but finished the league in second place, securing promotion to the United Counties League Premier in their first senior season. The club also took part in the FA Vase, United Counties League Knockout Cup and the Northants FA Les Underwood Junior Cup.

In 2013-14 the club entered the FA Cup for the first time. Starting in the competition's Extra Preliminary, they beat London Colney, Northwood, Cockfosters, and Cambridge City to reach the Third Qualifying Round, where they were defeated 3–1 away to Conference South side Dover Athletic. In the league, Rushden & Diamonds finished third.

Diamonds spent most of 2014-15 near the top of the table and, in anticipation, applied for promotion. In a season that included a 6-game winning streak, and 9–0 and 7–0 wins against Desborough Town and landlords Wellingborough Town, respectively, the club secured the United Counties League Premier Division title, their first ever honour, and promotion to the Southern League Division One Central. Diamonds made it a double by beating Potton United 3–0 in the final of the UCL Knockout-Cup.

Ahead of the 2015–16 season the club were informed by the Southern Football League that they must use the previously retired number 1 - retired in honour of Dale Roberts - despite the United Counties League and the Football Association having given the club prior permission. A petition was set up by supporters, and goalkeeper Matt Finlay wore 17 on his shirt in the first game of the season. Further appeals from the club eventually succeeded and the decision was overturned. Away from this, the club's promotion meant that they competed in the FA Trophy for the first time. In the FA Cup, Diamonds reached the Fourth Qualifying Round for the first time, where they lost 1–0 in replay against Barwell. After spending some time at the top of the table, in the league the club finished fifth, qualifying for the play-offs. After beating Royston Town in the semi-final they lost 2–1 in extra time to St Ives Town in the final. The season ended with a 2–1 victory in the Hillier Senior Cup Final against old rivals Kettering Town.

Diamonds were transferred to the Northern Premier League Division One South in 2016–17, where they again finished fifth. They qualified once more for the play-offs, but they were defeated 1–0 by Witton Albion in the semi-final. The FA transferred the club once again, this time back to the Southern League Division One Central.

They had initially planned to start the 2017–18 season playing their home games at Kempston Rovers' ground, ahead of a proposed move to Hayden Road in Rushden, however necessary works to Hayden Road were completed before the season start.

On 28 April 2018 Diamonds were promoted to Step 3 at the third time of asking, finishing second behind Beaconsfield Town; their third promotion in six seasons.

The 2018–19 season saw Diamonds finishing 9th on 61 points, 33 off rivals and league winners Kettering Town.

The 2019–20 season was Diamonds' second at Step 3 and contained notable results such as a 5–1 victory over Leiston and an 8–2 defeat to Bromsgrove Sporting. The season saw short cup runs in both the FA Trophy and the FA Cup, being defeated by South Shields and Enfield Town respectively. When the season was ended due to the COVID-19 pandemic, Diamonds were placed 11th in a very tight league, where they were just 4 points away from the playoff places.

Ground
The club's initial 2011–12 season was played in the Northants Senior Youth League, and games were played at Kiln Park, Raunds, the home of Raunds Town F.C.

The club's first senior season was in 2012–13, played at the Dog and Duck ground in Wellingborough. This arrangement remained for some years.

On 21 July 2016, Diamonds released a joint-statement with Wellingborough Town, confirming that the Dog and Duck landlord Alper Ozdogan had invoked a clause in Wellingborough's lease agreement, forcing them to leave the ground by 31 May 2017. This effectively brought an end to the current ground share agreement on that date. Diamonds confirmed that they would be seeking an alternative ground share agreement in the local area.

After a vote amongst the club's members, it was agreed to groundshare with Rushden & Higham United at Hayden Road in Rushden, starting from the 2017–18 season and until a new ground would be completed.

In November 2018, an agreement with the Duchy of Lancaster resulted in land being set aside along the B645 Chelveston Road for the construction of facilities to serve the club. This 30-year lease also includes the possibility of expansion into neighbouring areas should the opportunity arise.

As of the 2019–20 season, the club still groundshares with Rushden & Higham United.

Club badge
The club badge was voted on by the fans from three possible designs and was unveiled on 9 August 2011 at a fans forum at Kiln Park. It draws heavily upon the original Rushden and Diamonds, Rushden Town and Irthlingborough Diamonds crests. The "Rampant Lion", Crosskeys of Saint Peter's Church, blue diamonds and red stripes all reflect this inspiration.

Players

Current squad

The Southern Football League does not use a squad numbering system.

U23 squad 
Squad as 10 Sept 2022.

Graduates to the 1st team :
2022-23 
 2. Adeoluwa Bademosi (DF)
 4. Josh Going (DF)
 5. Dante Grey (DF)
 9. Dylan Surace (FW)
11. Ben Morley (FW)
17. Zander Watson (GK)
2021-22 
 7. Fraser Corden (MF)
14. Nigel Chikamba (MF)

U21 squad 
Squad as 16 Sept 2022.

Retired numbers

 – posthumous honour.

Player records
(as of 6 September 2022)
Records for league and all cups, appearance totals are starting + substituteShown are the top 10 players in each category.Source: 2019–20 Player and Match Stats

Managers

Matches include league, league cup, county cup, FA Vase and FA Cup matches.

Club officials

Board 
Chair : Rob Usher
Vice-Chair & Commercial Director: Alex Raspin
Club Secretary : Stacey Hawkins
Society Secretary : Brett Abbott
Director : Roger Paterson
Director : Dave Bland
Director : David Kalicki
Director : Jim Anker

Club 
Community Football: Mark Swindells
Programme Editor: Stephanie Webb
Club Chaplain: Canon Roger Knight
Fan's Chaplain: Rev Alan Jenkins

Coaching and medical staff 
Manager : Chris Nunn 
Youth Development Phase Lead 11–16 : Ryan Seaman
Foundation Development Phase Lead 6–10 : Mark Rust
Moulton College Education Scholarship : Tim Dudding
Goalkeeper Coaches : Louis Lawler
Physiotherapists : Juliette Baxter, Peter Cockings, Nicole Edwards

Kit

Rivalries
Most rivalries were formed when the supporters still followed the original club, however the rivalries commenced once fans started following the phoenix club. Although this means that whereas local rivalries with league clubs such as Luton Town, Peterborough United and even Northampton Town have died down, the rivalry with Kettering Town has been re-ignited, and new rivalries such as with Wellingborough Town have been developed.

Kettering Town
Rushden's main rivals are nearby Kettering Town. Rushden & Diamonds F.C and Kettering Town played seventeen competitive games together, 16 in the Conference National and one in the FA Cup. The first competitive game between the sides was played out on 8 March 1997, with Rushden running out comfortable 5–1 winners at Rockingham Road. In the early years, derby games between the two would regularly attract crowds in excess of 4,500. The clubs remained in the same division for five seasons before, in 2001, Rushden gained promotion to the Football League, while Kettering were relegated that same season from the Conference. After a seven-year gap, in 2008–09 the teams again found themselves in the same division, after Rushden suffered two quickfire relegations and Kettering gained promotion from the Conference North.

In the 16 league games contested and over 1,000 minutes of league football played between the two sides, Kettering won just twice, while Rushden recorded nine victories. In the same number of games, Rushden scored 25 goals to the Poppies' eight. On 3 January 2011 Kettering ended an 11-year wait for a win over the Diamonds, beating Rushden for only the second time in their history with a 2–1 triumph at Nene Park. Throughout the history of the fixture, Rushden & Diamonds maintained an impressive record of having never lost a competitive away match against Kettering Town.

The rivalry resumed on 6 May 2016, when AFC Rushden & Diamonds met Kettering in the NFA Hillier Senior Cup final, which Diamonds won 2–1 at Northampton Town's Sixfields Stadium.

Northampton Town
The rivalry between the Diamonds and Northampton Town occurred between 2004 and 06, when the two clubs played in League Two together for two seasons. Eight games were played between the sides – four competitive league games and four pre-season cup games. The Diamonds recorded a sole league victory over Northampton, a 3–2 win at Nene Park during the 2004–2005 season thanks to a last minute goal from Billy Sharp. They also beat their rivals in two pre-season Maunsell Cup games. After the Diamonds' relegation out of the Football League this rivalry diminished in relevance, especially as this relegation led to the re-ignition of the Rushden-Kettering rivalry.

Other local rivals
Past rivalries from the original club's younger years were also enjoyed with Kidderminster Harriers, Cheltenham Town and Yeovil Town, with the three clubs often competing against each other in their various play-off and championship pushes. Rushden also enjoyed rivalries with various other clubs throughout their history. Peterborough United and Luton Town were seen as small rivals during the club's Football League days, due to the relative geographical proximity of the three clubs. Following the original Diamonds' relegation into the Conference, however (despite Luton's presence there also) these rivalries diminished considerably. As the new entity, a ground-share with Wellingborough Town means that a rivalry between the two tenants has ensued in Wellingborough.

Season history
*As of 28 October 2021*

 
Most Goals in a Season: 28, Alfie Taylor, 2013–14
Highest Home Cup Attendance: 1,162 vs Barwell, FA Cup 4QR Replay, 27 October 2015
Highest Home League Attendance: 1,165 vs Kettering Town, Southern League Premier Central, 22 April 2019 
Highest Away Attendance: 2,147 vs Kettering Town, Southern League Premier Central, 1 January 2019
Longest Unbeaten League Run: 28 matches, 13 January 2015 - 31 October 2015
Largest Competitive Win:
9-0 vs Buckingham Town, United Counties League Division One, 15 December 2012
9-0 vs Desborough Town, United Counties League Premier Division, 21 February 2015
Largest Competitive Defeat: 8–2 vs Bromsgrove Sporting, Southern League Premier League Central, 5 October 2019

Honours

Senior

United Counties Football League Premier Division (Level 9)
Champions: 2014–15
 KO Cup Winners: 2014–15
United Counties Football League Division One (Level 10)
Runners-up: 2012–13
NFA Hillier Cup Winners: 2016, 2019
NFA Maunsell Cup Winners: 2016
The James Victory Cup
Winners: 2013, 2014
 Supporters Direct Shield
 Winners: 2014

Academy U23s
The Chris Ruff Trophy    
Winners: 2022-23

Academy U21s
Midland Football League : Division U21 East    
Runners Up: 2020–21

Academy U18s
Northants Football Association David Joyce Cup Winners: 2017–18
Northants Senior Youth League Western Division Champions: 2012–13
Northants Senior Youth League Read-Flex Vase Winners: 2012–13
Northants Senior Youth League Knock-Out Cup Winners: 2011–12

See also
Rushden & Diamonds F.C.
Phoenix club (sports)

References

External links

2011 establishments in England
Association football clubs established in 2011
Football clubs in England
Football clubs in Northamptonshire
Fan-owned football clubs in England
Phoenix clubs (association football)
Rushden
Southern Football League clubs
United Counties League